Within customer relationship management, a customer value model (CVM) is a data-driven representation of the worth, in monetary terms, of what a company is doing or could do for its customers. Customer value models are tools used primarily in B2B markets where the choice of a given product, service, or offering is based primarily upon the amount customer value created. Customer value is defined as Value = Benefits - Price. Thus, customer benefits are quantified in a CVM - product features and capabilities are translated into dollars. Customer value models are different from customer lifetime value models, which seek to quantify the value of a customer to its suppliers.

Firms using customer value models
Many firms have been reported to use customer value models, including General Electric, Alcoa, W.W. Grainger, Qualcomm, Sonoco, BT Industries Group, Rockwell Automation, and Akzo Nobel.

Uses of customer value models

New product and service development and refinement: The dialog and customer immersion that is part of a CVM is used to discover and determine which potential product features and functionality would create the most value for customers. This on-site interaction can be used to frame and define those features and functionality. Often a key is to focus on product or service capabilities rather than on features. Successful CVM efforts change the basis of the customer-supplier product conversation away from features and functions and toward problems, benefits, and value.
Sales tools: CVMs can serve as a quantified statement of value and benefits for a customer that is used by the vendor sales staff to both sell into a new account, as well as to reaffirm and validate value created for current customers as a means to retain and grow current customer. CVMs also can help firms to determine the more rational promotion cost.

Customer value model methods
There are several methods and approaches used to create customer value models. All of these approaches appear to depend on substantial customer interaction and on-site interviews and observations of customers' challenges related to the product or service being valued. The CVMs are of varying complexity. One consulting firm has found it useful to reverse-engineer customer P&Ls (profit and loss statements) to establish a clear connection between the product benefits and the customer bottom-line.

References 

Value